U.S. Highway 55 was a north–south United States highway.  Though it was part of the original 1926 numbering plan, it was deleted within 10 years.

Route description
From its southern terminus in Davenport, Iowa, U.S. Highway 55 initially followed the route of present-day U.S. Highway 52 through Hampton, Minnesota excepting for later local improvements such as the Rochester and Decorah bypasses. It was deleted 80 years ago.

North of Hampton, Minnesota, U.S. Highway 55 headed north and west to downtown Minneapolis. Within the village of Hampton, Minnesota, U.S. Highway 55 followed along Main Street and present-day Minnesota Highway 50 to Farmington. Within Farmington, the highway had a shared segment with what was then U.S. Highway 65 (now Minnesota Highway 3) to Elm Street in Hampton.

From Farmington, U.S. Highway 55 headed westward to Burnsville via present-day 212th Street West, Lakeville Blvd, 210th Street West, Kenwood Trail, and Burnsville Parkway to Lyndale Ave (now Interstate 35W). Following the decommissioning of U.S. Highway 55, the portion of the route between Farmington and Burnsville was subsequently designated as a portion of Minnesota Highway 50, and transferred to County control in 1994 as Dakota County Road 50. From Burnsville, U.S. Highway 55 again turned northwards, following Lyndale Avenue across the Minnesota River and into Downtown Minneapolis via Lyndale Avenue, Lake Street, and 3rd Avenue.

History
When the route was designated in 1926, its northern terminus was in Minneapolis at an intersection with U.S. Highway 12, near the Mississippi River. Its southern terminus was in Dubuque, Iowa, at an intersection with U.S. Highway 61 (or possibly U.S. Highway 20). In 1932, US 55 was extended south to Davenport, Iowa, to another intersection with US 61. While US 61 followed a more direct route from Dubuque to Davenport, the new US 55 extension followed the western shore of the Mississippi River.

Just two years later, in 1934, US 55 was deleted entirely. U.S. Highway 67 was extended through Davenport to Dubuque, absorbing the 1932 extension of US 55. The northern half of this stretch was co-signed with an extension of U.S. Highway 52, which took over the US 55 designation to Hampton, Minnesota. From Hampton, US 52 was routed to Saint Paul via Minnesota Highway 56 to Inver Grove Heights and Robert Street into downtown Saint Paul. The remainder of U.S. Highway 55 north and west of Hampton was designated as U.S. Highway 65. The prior routing of U.S. Highway 65 into from Farmington to Saint Paul was redesignated as U.S. Highway 218 for one year, and subsequently redesignated as Minnesota Highway 218, and later as Minnesota Highway 3.

The number "55" was later proposed for the route which would become U.S. Highway 56.

Major intersections

References
 Information regarding routes of the U.S. Highways within Minnesota was obtained from vintage maps provided by the Mid-West Map Company (1929) and H.M. Gousha Company (1935 and 1940).

External links

Endpoints of US highway 55

 
U.S. Highways in Iowa
U.S. Highways in Minnesota
Former U.S. Highways
1926 establishments in Iowa
1926 establishments in Minnesota
1934 disestablishments in Iowa
1934 disestablishments in Minnesota
55